Nannoarctia obliquifascia is a moth of the family Erebidae first described by George Hampson in 1894. It is found in Myanmar, Thailand, Vietnam, the Malay Peninsula and southern China (southern Sichuan, Yunnan, Guangxi, Guangdong and Hainan).

References

Moths described in 1894
Spilosomina